The men's artistic team competition at the 2014 Asian Games in Incheon, South Korea was held on 21 September 2014 at the Namdong Gymnasium.

Schedule
All times are Korea Standard Time (UTC+09:00)

Results 
Legend
DNS — Did not start

References

Results

External links
Official website

Artistic Men Team